National Highway 766EE, commonly referred to as NH 766EE is a national highway in India. It is a secondary route of National Highway 66.  NH-766EE runs in the state of Karnataka in India.

Route 
NH766EE connects Hattikeri and Belekeri Port in the state of Karnataka.

Junctions  
 
  Terminal near Hattikeri.

See also 
 List of National Highways in India
 List of National Highways in India by state

References

External links 

 NH 766EE on OpenStreetMap

National highways in India
National Highways in Karnataka